Paturel is a surname. Notable people with the surname include:

 Dominique Paturel (1931–2022), French voice, stage, and film actor
 Robert Paturel (born 1952), French boxer
 Sabine Paturel (born 1965), French singer and actress